Arthur Sauvé,  (October 1, 1874 – February 6, 1944) was born in Saint-Hermas (today part of Mirabel, Quebec).

The Legislative Assembly of Quebec member for Deux-Montagnes from 1908 to 1930, he was leader of the Quebec Conservative Party but never premier.  He was the father of future premier Paul Sauvé.

In 1930 he moved to federal politics and became Postmaster General in the Cabinet of Richard Bennett until 1935.  In 1935 he was appointed to the Senate.

He was also the mayor of the municipality of Saint-Benoît from 1906 to 1923.

Elections as party leader
Quebec: He lost the 1919 election, 1923 election, and 1927 election.

See also
Politics of Quebec
List of Quebec general elections
List of Quebec leaders of the Opposition
Timeline of Quebec history

References

1874 births
1944 deaths
Canadian senators from Quebec
Mayors of places in Quebec
Members of the King's Privy Council for Canada
Members of the House of Commons of Canada from Quebec
Conservative Party of Canada (1867–1942) MPs
Conservative Party of Canada (1867–1942) senators
Conservative Party of Quebec MNAs
People from Mirabel, Quebec
Postmasters General of Canada
Quebec political party leaders